was a Japanese rakugo performer of the late 20th century, who often performed in English. He was born  in Kobe, the son of a brick-maker. In 1960 he entered the tutelage of the rakugo performer , and upon completion of his study, was given the stage name . He changed his stage name to Shijaku Katsura (Shijaku Katsura II) in 1974.

Katsura studied English in the early 1980s, and gave his first English-language rakugo performance in 1983. For the rest of his career, he often performed rakugo in the United States, Canada, and elsewhere, making an otherwise inaccessible form of comedy accessible for non-Japanese speakers.

He also assisted in launching the career of Bill Crowley, the non-Japanese professional rakugo performer.

Katsura died of heart failure on April 19, 1999, after a suicide attempt at his home in Suita, Osaka. He was discovered by his wife Eyo and his brother, the magician Takeshi Maeda.

Notes

References

Shijaku Katsura obituary (accessed 21 December 2007)
"Der Schreiber" (German translation of one of Katsura's rakugo, including a short biography) (accessed 21 December 2007)
"Sushi and Sake" interview with Bill Crowley. (accessed 21 December 2007)
Perkins, Dorothy (1991). Encyclopedia of Japan: Japanese History and Culture, from Abacus to Zori. n.p.: Facts on File.

Further reading
Works in Japanese
Katsura, Shijaku (1996). Katsura Shijaku no rakugo-annai. Tokyo: Chikuma-shobo.
Ueda, Fumiyo (2003). Warawasete warawasete Katsura Shijaku. Tokyo: Tankōsha.

1939 births
1999 deaths
People from Kobe
Rakugoka
20th-century comedians